Gabriel Costa may refer to:

 Gabriel Costa (politician) (born 1954), former Prime Minister of São Tomé and Príncipe
 Gabriel Costa (footballer) (born 1990), Peruvian football midfielder
 Gabriel Costa França (born 1995), Brazilian football defender